is the debut single by Japanese singer Chisato Moritaka. Written by HIRO and Hideo Saitō, the single was released by Warner Pioneer on March 25, 1987. The song was used as the theme song of the 1987 Toho film Aitsu ni Koishite, which also featured Moritaka's acting debut. It was also featured in the Fuji TV drama special , also starring Moritaka.

Background 
Shortly after winning the first Pocari Sweat Image Girl Contest in 1986, Moritaka moved from Kumamoto to Tokyo to begin her entertainment career. A team of songwriters led by Hiromasa Ijichi (using the pseudonym "HIRO") and Hideo Saitō were brought in to compose materials for her debut album (also titled New Season), as she had not yet experimented on writing her own songs.

In the music video, as well as earlier live performances, Moritaka played percussion and the keyboard solo; she has since focused only on vocals on the song.

The single was re-released on mini CD format on March 25, 1988, with "Overheat Night" replacing "Period" as the B-side.

Chart performance 
"New Season" peaked at No. 23 on Oricon's singles chart and sold 44,000 copies.

Other versions 
"New Season" was remixed for the 1989 greatest hits album Moritaka Land.

Moritaka re-recorded the song on vocals and drums and uploaded the video on her YouTube channel on December 22, 2012. This version is also included in Moritaka's 2013 self-covers DVD album Love Vol. 3.

Track listing 
All lyrics are written by HIRO, except where indicated; all music is composed and arranged by Hideo Saitō.

Personnel 
 Chisato Moritaka – vocals, keyboard
 Hideo Saitō – guitar, backing vocals
 Nobita Tsukada – keyboards
 Yasuhiko Fukuda – keyboards
 Chiharu Mikuzugi – bass
 Reuben Tsujino – drums
 Yukari Fujio – backing vocals

Chart positions

References

External links 
 
 
 

1987 debut singles
1987 songs
Japanese-language songs
Chisato Moritaka songs
Songs with lyrics by Hiromasa Ijichi
Songs with music by Hideo Saitō (musician, born 1958)
Warner Music Japan singles